Dendropsophus decipiens is a species of frog in the family Hylidae. It is endemic to eastern  Brazil between the Pernambuco and Rio de Janeiro states, or following IUCN, between the Maranhão and São Paulo states. It is also known as Brazilian coastal treefrog.

Typically, it is found on vegetation near water. The eggs are laid on tree leaves above bodies of water (both temporary and permanent); the tadpoles fall into the water where they continue to develop. It is a very adaptable species that does not face any known threats and that occurs in many protected areas.

References

decipiens
Amphibians of Brazil
Endemic fauna of Brazil
Amphibians described in 1925
Taxa named by Adolfo Lutz
Taxonomy articles created by Polbot